Hindu Rashtra means Hindu nation. 

Hindu Rashtra may also refer to:

 Hindu Rashtra Sena, an Indian Hindu Political Party
 Hindu Rashtra (book) by Ashtosh
 Our Hindu Rashtra, a book by Aakar Patel